Junior Mance Special is a solo album by jazz pianist Junior Mance recorded in the studio and live and released on the Sackville label in 1989.

Reception

The Allmusic site awarded the album 4 stars, noting: "While he's best at blues-tinged material, Mance shows the versatility necessary to do other material and doesn't substitute clichés and gimmicks for ideas and substance".

Track listing
 "Yancey Special" (Meade Lux Lewis, Andy Razaf) - 5:15
 "Careless Love (Traditional) - 6:54
 "If You Could See Me Now" (Tadd Dameron, Carl Sigman) - 3:50
 "I Wish I Knew How It Would Feel to Be Free" (Billy Taylor) - 6:03
 "Since I Lost My Baby I Almost Lost My Mind" (Ivory Joe Hunter) - 6:18
 "I Got It Bad (And That Ain't Good)" (Duke Ellington, Paul Francis Webster) - 5:54
 "In a Sentimental Mood" (Ellington, Manny Kurtz, Irving Mills) - 6:21
 "Blue Monk" (Thelonious Monk) - 6:45
 "Whisper Not" (Benny Golson) - 7:14
 "Flat on Your Face" (Junior Mance) - 5:08 
Recorded at Cherry Beach Sound in Toronto, Canada on September 14, 1986 (tracks 1-5), and Cafe des Copains, Toronto, Canada on November 30, 1988 (tracks 6-10)

Personnel
Junior Mance - piano

References

1989 albums
Junior Mance albums
Sackville Records albums